World Meteorological Day was established in 1961 to commemorate the World Meteorological Organization creation on 23 March 1950. This organization announces a slogan for World Meteorology Day every year, and this day is celebrated in all member countries.

History and activities 
The World Meteorological Organisation (WMO), an organization of the United Nations, was created on 23 March 1950 to replace the International Meteorological Organization. It began operations in 1951 to coordinate member nation in the fields of meteorology, operational hydrology, and Earth sciences for the security of their population. The first World Meteorological Day was held on 23 March 1961.

Themes 
Under is a few of the themes of recent years:

 Early Warning and Early Action, 23 March 2022
 The Ocean, Our Climate and Weather, 23 March 2021 
 Climate and Water, 23 March 2020 
 The Sun, the Earth and the Weather, 23 March 2019
 Weather-ready, climate-smart, 23 March 2018
 Understanding clouds, 23 March 2017
 Hotter, drier, wetter - Face the future, 23 March 2016
 Climate knowledge for Climate Action, 23 March 2015
 Weather and Climate: Engaging youth, 23 March 2014
 Watching the weather to protect life and property: Celebrating 50 years of World Weather Watch, 23 March 2013
 Powering our future with weather, climate and water, 23 March 2012
 Climate for you, 23 March 2011
 60 years of service for your safety and well-being (2010)
 Weather, climate and the air we breathe (2009)
 Observing our planet for a better future (2008)
 Polar meteorology: Understanding global impacts (2007)
 Preventing and mitigating natural disasters (2006)
 Weather, climate, water and sustainable development (2005)
 Weather, climate, water in the information age (2004)
 Our future climate (2003)

Notes and references

External links 

Website by the WMO to the World Meteorological Day
 Themes of previous World Meteorological Days

World Meteorological Organization
March observances
Awards established in 1950
Environmental awareness days
United Nations days